Wayne Ferreira and Jim Grabb were the defending champions, but did not participate this year.

Grant Connell and Patrick Galbraith won the title, defeating Alex Antonitsch and Alexander Volkov 6–3, 7–6 in the final.

Seeds

  Grant Connell /  Patrick Galbraith (champions)
  Martin Damm /  Vojtěch Flégl (first round)
  Royce Deppe /  Brett Steven (semifinals)
  T.J. Middleton /  Sven Salumaa (quarterfinals)

Draw

Draw

References

External links
Draw

ATP Auckland Open
1993 ATP Tour